Minooka Community High School, or MCHS, is a public four-year high school located in Minooka, Illinois, a southwest suburb of Chicago, in the United States. It is part of Minooka Community High School District 111.

History
The doors to the high school were opened in 1917 and have since grown to 2,500+ students. Minooka Community High School District 111 is a mid-sized school district located in the far southwest suburb of Chicago. The district is largely composed of the communities of Minooka and Channahon, and also includes portions of Shorewood and Joliet.

Central Campus
Outside of transfers, students come to Minooka Community High School from three feeder school districts: Minooka Community Consolidated School District 201, Channahon School District 17, and Troy Community Consolidated School District 30-C.

Several additions have been made to the building over the years. The first addition added hallways to the ends of the existing hallways to create two square hallways coming off of the main walkways. With that addition in the 1990s, Minooka added more technology and classroom space. Next came the new physical education department space that has been added in the early 2000s. This addition created more room for PE classes, along with drivers' ed classrooms and more. The other big addition that same year was building a new lunch room, the Cafetorium. This glass panel, rounded room, is the location of lunch, after school programs, athletic practices, concerts, musicals & plays, and the homecoming dance.

South Campus
This addition was created in the mid-2000s and was opened for the first time for the 2008–2009 school year.  It currently serves as a freshman/sophomore campus while the original building is a junior/senior campus.

Academics
In 2006, Minooka had an average composite ACT score of 21.8, and graduated 93.7% of its senior class. The average class size was 29.7. Minooka offers many elective options for students in every subject and vocational area.

Muffin Controversy 
During the fall of 2017, MCHS along with Quest Food Management Services removed many food items from the menu due to allergies and other reasons, causing uproar. Owen Sterba, the News Team editor for the school's news paper (Peace Pipe Chatter - renamed Nook news in 2021), took it upon himself to write an opinion piece on the matter.  Published on November 2nd, 2017 in Volume 103 Edition 3 Sterba said "MCHS cannot accommodate to everyone’s needs, if someone has an allergy they either shouldn’t get that food or bring their own lunch from home, so that they know what’s in it." Weeks later the muffins returned to the school menu. Sterba is credited for bringing them back.

Notable alumni
 Chris Başak, MLB player
 Mike Foltynewicz, MLB pitcher
 Nick Offerman, actor

References

Public high schools in Illinois
Schools in Grundy County, Illinois
Education in Joliet, Illinois